Ali-Qoli Beg (died 1615) was a Safavid official, who briefly served as governor of Kartli together with his brother Emamqoli Beg, during the reign of king (shah) Abbas I (1588–1629).

He was appointed as governor of Kartli together with his brother when Abbas I launched his punitive campaigns in Georgia. 

Ali-Qoli Beg and his brother Emamqoli Beg were the sons of Behbud Agha, a Georgian gholam of Mohammad Khan Tokhmaq Ustajlu, the former governor of the Erivan Province. Behbud Agha hailed from a Kartlian noble family (tavadi), and had converted to Islam during his service to Mohammad Khan Tokhmaq. 

In 1615, during the revolt in Georgia against the Safavid rule, Ali-Qoli Beg was killed.

References

Sources
 

16th-century births
1615 deaths
Safavid governors of Kartli
Iranian people of Georgian descent
Safavid ghilman
Shia Muslims from Georgia (country)
Nobility of Georgia (country)
16th-century people of Safavid Iran
17th-century people of Safavid Iran